Jason Herrick (born October 5, 1987 in Elmhurst, Illinois) is a retired American soccer player.

Career

College and Amateur
Herrick played college soccer at the University of Maryland, where during his five-year career he managed 29 goals in 86 appearances, and was a 2009 and 2010 First Team All-ACC, 2010 All-ACC Tournament Team and 2006 All-ACC Freshman Team.

Professional
On January 14, 2011, Herrick was drafted in the third round (45th overall) in the 2011 MLS SuperDraft by Chicago Fire, but was released by the club without signing.

Herrick signed his first professional contract with Harrisburg City Islanders on April 12, 2011, and made his professional debut on April 23 in a 1-0 loss to the Pittsburgh Riverhounds.

Herrick retired from professional soccer after just one season due to a concussion injury he sustained early in the 2011 USL Pro season.

References

External links
 Maryland profile

1987 births
Living people
American soccer players
Maryland Terrapins men's soccer players
Penn FC players
USL Championship players
Chicago Fire FC draft picks
Soccer players from Illinois
Association football forwards